Lieutenant General Ted Francis Bowlds (born September 11, 1953) is a former Commander, Electronic Systems Center, Hanscom Air Force Base, Mass. The center's mission is to acquire command and control systems for the Air Force. The organization comprises more than 12,000 people located at six sites throughout the United States. The men and women of the ESC manage more than $3 billion in programs annually in support of the Air Force, and joint and coalition forces.

General Bowlds entered the Air Force in 1975 through the AFROTC program. In earlier assignments, he served as an engineer in an Air Force laboratory and as a flight test engineer on the F-117. He has worked as avionics program manager on the B-2, bomber branch chief at the Pentagon, chief of advance medium range air-to-air missile development in the AMRAAM System Program Office, and as commander of the Rome Laboratory in Rome, New York.

General Bowlds also served as the deputy director of global power programs with the Office of the Assistant Secretary of the Air Force for Acquisition, Headquarters U.S. Air Force, Washington, D.C. Prior to assuming his current position, he was assigned as commander, Air Force Research Laboratory, Wright-Patterson AFB, Ohio. He was responsible for managing the Air Force's $2 billion science and technology program as well as additional customer-funded research and development of $1.7 billion.

Life
General Bowlds was a member of the Civil Air Patrol and earned the Spaatz award.  He is now the vice president of the Spaatz Association.

General Bowlds is a 1973 graduate of Mississippi State University, with a degree in electrical engineering.  He was a member of Triangle Fraternity at Mississippi State, and continues to serve his fraternity as a member of the board of directors of the Triangle Education Foundation.

The General currently is CEO of Innovative Perspectives, LLC, a consulting firm that advises companies on strategic planning and contract proposals.

Education
 1975 Bachelor of Science degree in electrical engineering, Mississippi State University
 1979 Master of Science degree in electrical engineering, Air Force Institute of Technology, Wright-Patterson AFB, Ohio
 1980 Flight Test Engineers Course, U.S. Air Force Test Pilot School, Edwards AFB, California
 1983 Squadron Officer School, Maxwell AFB, Alabama
 1985 Air Command and Staff College, by correspondence
 1985 Defense Systems Management College, Fort Belvoir, Virginia
 1992 Master of Science degree in engineering management, University of Dayton, Ohio
 1993 Air War College, by correspondence
 1994 Air War College, Maxwell AFB, Alabama
 2000 Advanced Management Program, the University of Michigan's Ross School of Business
 2002 National Security Management Course, Syracuse University, Syracuse, New York

Assignments
 May 1975 – June 1978, computer systems analyst, Aeronautical Systems Division, Wright-Patterson AFB, Ohio
 July 1978 – December 1979, project engineer and global positioning system evaluator, Air Force Avionics Laboratory, Aeronautical Systems Division, Wright-Patterson AFB, Ohio
 January 1980 – December 1980, student, U.S. Air Force Test Pilot School, Edwards AFB, California
 January 1981 – December 1984, F-117 test program manager, Air Force Flight Test Center, Detachment 3, Air Force Systems Command, Edwards AFB, California
 January 1985 – June 1985, student, Defense Systems Management College, Fort Belvoir, Virginia
 July 1985 – June 1989, chief, B-2 Avionics Branch, B-2 System Program Office, Aeronautical Systems Division, Wright-Patterson AFB, Ohio
 July 1989 – June 1993, chief of Bomber Branch, Directorate of Long-Range Power Projection, Special Operations Forces, Airlift and Training Programs, Office of the Secretary of the Air Force for Acquisition, Washington, D.C.
 July 1993 – June 1994, student, Air War College, Maxwell AFB, Alabama
 July 1994 – August 1995, chief of Advance Medium Range Air-to-Air Missile Development Integrated Process Team, AMRAAM System Program Office, Aeronautical Systems Center, Eglin AFB, Florida
 September 1995 – July 1997, commander of Air Force Rome Laboratory, Air Force Materiel Command, Rome, New York
 July 1997 – February 1999, deputy director of Global Power Programs, Office of the Secretary of the Air Force for Acquisition, Washington, D.C.
 March 1999 – September 2001, program director of C-17 System Program Office, Aeronautical Systems Center, Wright-Patterson AFB, Ohio
 September 2001 – January 2004, program executive officer for airlift and trainers, Headquarters U.S. Air Force, Washington, D.C.
 February 2004 – January 2006, deputy for acquisition, Aeronautical Systems Center, Wright-Patterson AFB, Ohio
 January 2006 – November 2007, commander of Air Force Research Laboratory, Wright-Patterson AFB, Ohio
 November 2007 – 1 September 2011, commander of Electronic Systems Center, Hanscom AFB, Mass.

Major awards and decorations
  Air Force Distinguished Service Medal
  Legion of Merit with oak leaf cluster
  Defense Meritorious Service Medal
  Meritorious Service Medal with three oak leaf clusters
  Air Force Commendation Medal with two oak leaf clusters
  Air Force Achievement Medal with oak leaf cluster

Effective dates of promotion
 Second Lieutenant June 4, 1975
 First Lieutenant July 31, 1977
 Captain July 31, 1979
 Major December 1, 1986
 Lieutenant Colonel April 1, 1990
 Colonel July 1, 1996
 Brigadier General July 1, 2002
 Major General November 1, 2005
 Lieutenant General  November 7, 2007

References

United States Air Force generals
Recipients of the Air Force Distinguished Service Medal
Recipients of the Legion of Merit
Air Force Institute of Technology alumni
Living people
Mississippi State University alumni
University of Dayton alumni
Triangle Fraternity
1953 births